Toyin Adewale-Gabriel (born 1969) is a Nigerian writer. She writes poetry and has worked as a literary critic for The Guardian, Post Express and The Daily Times. Adewale-Gabriel writes in both English and in German.

Biography 
Born in Ibadan, Nigeria, Toyin received her M.A. Lit. degree from Obafemi Awolowo University. She was the co-founder and co-ordinator for several years of the Association of Writers of Nigeria.

Works 
Her works include: Naked Testimonies, 1995; Breaking The Silence, 1996; Inkwells, 1997; Die Aromaforscherin, 1998; Flackernde Kerzen, 1999; 25 New Nigerian Poets, 2000; Aci Cikolata, Gunizi Yayincilik, 2003; and Nigerian Women Short Stories, 2005. She has also won awards for poetry and short fiction.

Naked Testimonies deals with Nigerian politics, and the poems are reflective and personal.

References

1969 births
Living people
Yoruba writers
Writers from Ibadan
Nigerian women poets
Obafemi Awolowo University alumni
20th-century Nigerian poets
21st-century Nigerian poets
21st-century Nigerian women writers
20th-century Nigerian women writers